Labeobarbus nanningsi is a species of cyprinid fish in the genus Labeobarbus from Angola.

References 

 

nanningsi
Fish described in 1933